The Zürich Engagement is a 1957 West German comedy film directed by Helmut Käutner and starring Liselotte Pulver, Paul Hubschmid, and Bernhard Wicki. A young woman working at a dentist's office falls in love with one of the patients. She writes down her fantasies about him, but problems arise when her words are discovered and are turned into a screenplay for a new film. It is also known by the alternative title The Affairs of Julie.

It was shot at the Wandsbek Studios in Hamburg. The film's sets were designed by the art directors Albrecht Becker and Herbert Kirchhoff.

Partial cast

References

Bibliography

External links 
 

1957 films
1957 romantic comedy films
German romantic comedy films
West German films
1950s German-language films
Films directed by Helmut Käutner
Films set in Berlin
Films set in Zürich
Films based on German novels
Films about filmmaking
Films about writers
Films shot at Wandsbek Studios
1950s German films